The 1995 Nabisco Dinah Shore was a women's professional golf tournament, held March 23–26 at Mission Hills Country Club in Rancho Mirage, California. This was the 24th edition of the Nabisco Dinah Shore, and the thirteenth as a major championship.

Nanci Bowen won her only major title, one stroke ahead of runner-up  it was her sole victory on the  Tammie Green was the 54-hole leader, followed by Nancy Lopez and Laura Davies, but all three were over par on Sunday. Bowen and Redman were four strokes back after three rounds at  Bowen was one shot better in the final round with 70

Past champions in the field

Made the cut

Source:

Missed the cut

Source:

Final leaderboard
Sunday, March 26, 1995

Source:

Scorecard
Final round

Cumulative tournament scores, relative to par
{|class="wikitable" span = 50 style="font-size:85%;
|-
|style="background: Pink;" width=10|
|Birdie
|style="background: PaleGreen;" width=10|
|Bogey
|style="background: Green;" width=10|
|Double bogey
|}
Source:

References

External links
Golf Observer leaderboard

Chevron Championship
Golf in California
Nabisco Dinah Shore
Nabisco Dinah Shore
Nabisco Dinah Shore
Nabisco Dinah Shore
Women's sports in California